Matthieu Hartley (born 4 February 1960) is an English musician born in Smallfield, England. He is best known for as the original keyboardist for The Cure. Before then he was in Lockjaw and The Magazine Spies and was in several bands after leaving The Cure.

Biography 
Before joining The Cure he and fellow band member Simon Gallup were involved in two other bands called Lockjaw and the Magspies (a.k.a. the Magazine Spies).

In November 1979, he and Gallup joined The Cure; replacing Michael Dempsey. They both helped drive the band in an entirely new direction with the recording of their second album, Seventeen Seconds, a much darker album than their debut, Three Imaginary Boys.

Hartley also played keyboards for the Cult Hero project.

After a lengthy world tour to support Seventeen Seconds, he departed in August 1980. This was after the fraught Australian leg of the tour. Hartley also stated a difference of opinion with the other three members, "I realised the group were heading towards suicidal, sombre music", adding, "The sort of thing that didn’t interest me at all."

Since leaving The Cure, he has played with different local bands, including Fools Dance in their early stages, as well as many newer small bands in Brighton including the Icicle Thieves, and currently, power pop band, The Speak.

References

1960 births
Living people
The Cure members
English keyboardists
English new wave musicians